Calosoma regelianum is a species of ground beetle in the family Carabidae. It is found in Tadzhikistan and Afghanistan.

Subspecies
These two subspecies belong to the species Calosoma regelianum:
 Calosoma regelianum klapperichi Mandl, 1955  (Afghanistan)
 Calosoma regelianum regelianum A.Morawitz, 1886  (Tadzhikistan)

References

Calosoma